Dion Beukeboom (born 2 February 1989) is a Dutch former racing cyclist, who rode professionally between 2012 and 2019 for the , ,  and  squads. He rode at the 2013 UCI Road World Championships.

Major results

2011
 5th Road race, National Under-23 Road Championships
2012
 3rd Individual pursuit, National Track Championships
 8th Overall Tour de Normandie
1st Stage 7
2013
 1st Prologue (TTT) Volta a Portugal
 National Track Championships
2nd Individual pursuit
2nd Scratch
3rd Omnium
 3rd  Team pursuit, UEC European Track Championships
2014
 National Track Championships
1st  Individual pursuit
2nd Scratch
2015
 1st Stage 5a (ITT) Olympia's Tour
 3rd  Individual pursuit, UEC European Track Championships
 7th Rutland–Melton CiCLE Classic
2016
 National Track Championships
1st  Individual pursuit
3rd Madison (with Jeff Vermeulen)
 2nd Himmerland Rundt
 3rd  Individual pursuit, UEC European Track Championships
 3rd  Individual pursuit, 2016–17 UCI Track Cycling World Cup, Glasgow
 4th Overall Flèche du Sud
 5th Rutland–Melton CiCLE Classic
 9th Ronde van Noord-Holland
2017
 National Track Championships
1st  Individual pursuit
2nd Madison (with Jan-Willem van Schip)
 4th Ronde van Noord-Holland
2018
 3rd Arno Wallaard Memorial
 4th Time trial, National Road Championships
 9th PWZ Zuidenveld Tour

References

External links

1989 births
Living people
Dutch male cyclists
People from Ouder-Amstel
Place of birth missing (living people)
Cyclists from North Holland